Nanorana pleskei (common names: Songpan slow frog, Pleske's high altitude frog, plateau frog) is a species of frog in the family Dicroglossidae. Notice, however, that earlier records outside China have turned out to be misidentifications.

Its natural habitats are subtropical high-altitude shrubland, grassland, rivers, swamps, intermittent freshwater marshes, and ponds. It is threatened by habitat loss.

References

Nanorana
Amphibians of Bhutan
Amphibians of China
Taxonomy articles created by Polbot
Amphibians described in 1896
Taxa named by Albert Günther